Robert Edward Gurney, Luton, England, 1939, is a British writer. He lives in St Albans, England.

Biography 
He studied Modern Languages at St Andrews University in Scotland. He has travelled widely in Europe, Africa and Latin America. Between 1964 and 1967 he studied and worked in Uganda. In 1972 he conducted interviews with the Spanish poet Juan Larrea in Córdoba, Argentina. He obtained a doctorate in Spanish from the University of London in 1975, thesis title:The Poetry of Juan Larrea. He lectured on Modern French Poetry, The Generation of ’27 and Modern Latin American Poetry at Middlesex University.

Much of Gurney's work is in the British Library and the National Library of Wales. He writes in English and Spanish.

Works

Poetry 
Poemas a la Patagonia, St Albans, 2004.
Luton Poems, St Albans, 2005.
El cuarto oscuro y otros poemas, Madrid, 2008.
Poemas a la Patagonia, edición aumentada, Madrid, 2009.
La libélula y otros poemas / The Dragonfly and Other Poems, Madrid, 2013.
La casa de empeño y otros poemas / The Pawn Shop and Other Poems, Madrid, 2014.
To Dylan, Llandeilo, 2014.
Dylan’s Gower, Llandeilo, 2014.
El acantilado y otros poemas, Llandeilo, 2017.
Antología poética, Madrid, 2018 
Two Days in Ireland, 2018.

Short stories 
A Night in Buganda, Tales from Post-Colonial Africa, St Albans, 2014
Absurd Tales from Africa, Llandeilo, 2017
Bat Valley and Other Strange African Animal Stories, Llandeilo, 2017

Translation 
The River and Other Poems, translation of Andrés Bohoslavsky’s El río y otros poemas, St Albans, 2004

Anthologies 
Nueve monedas para el barquero, St Albans, 2005
Los poetas de la senda, antología de la poesía mundial, Madrid, 2014
 Stories in Antología de cuento breve, serial pecados, México, 2012 – 2015: "The Greedy Academic", Gula; "The Last King of Rwanda’s Jaguar", Envidia; "90 Harley Street", Soberbia; "Greed in Buganda", Avaricia; "El afroamericano enojado" ("The Angry African American"), Ira; "Una noche en Buganda", Lujuria; "El perezoso" ("The Lazy Man"), Pereza

Academic 
La poesia de Juan Larrea, Bilbao, 1985
 Articles and chapters in books on the Hispanic avant-garde - Larrea, Huidobro, Vallejo, Diego, Picasso, Buñuel, 1976-2004

Media 
In 2014 he was filmed for the series on contemporary poets (Spain).

Awards 
 In 2007 Gurney won a prize for poems on the theme "Rimbaud" in the Concurso de Poesía Libre de Artesanías Literarias, Israel.
 In 2010 he won a Juan Laurentino Ortiz prize, Paraná, Argentina.

References 

British writers
1939 births
Living people